Spanish Moon (foaled April 24, 2004) is an American-bred and British-trained Thoroughbred racehorse, owned by Khalid Abdullah. He became famous for running second in the Dubai Sheema Classic. His one group one win came in the Grand Prix de Saint-Cloud.

Due to unruly behaviour at the starting stalls he was banned from racing in the United Kingdom for six months from May 2009.

References 
racingpost.com stats
Spanish Moon pedigree and partial racing stats

2004 racehorse births
Thoroughbred family 4-m
Racehorses trained in the United Kingdom
Racehorses bred in Kentucky